The Casane Astigiane (Italian for "Houses of Asti") were the major family banking houses of Asti, Italy in the  middle ages. Their economic activities included currency exchange and lending.

Guelf Families
 Solaro. Without a doubt the most influential Guelf house.
 Falletti
 Troja
 Malabaila

Ghibelline Families
 Guttuari, most powerful Ghibelline family, often aligned with the rulers of Montferrat. With the Turco and the Isnardi families, they created the powerful De Castello consortium.
 Isnardi
 Turco or Turci
 Scarampi
 Alfieri
  Buneo

Non-aligned Families
 Roero
 Pelletta
 Asinari

Bibliography
AA.VV, Il Platano , rivista per lo studio della cultura ed attività astigiana  raccolte dal 1977 al 2005
Aldo di Ricaldone  Annali del Monferrato Vol I and II, distributed by Lorenzo Fornaca, publisher Asti
Aldo di Ricaldone "Monferrato tra Po e Tanaro Vol.1/2 Gribaudo Lorenzo Fornaca editore sedico Asti 1999
Bianco A. Asti Medievale  .  Ed CRA 1960
Asti ai tempi della rivoluzione e dell'impero. Ed CRA 1960
Bera G. Asti edifici e palazzi nel medioevo. Gribaudo Lorenzo Fornaca Editore Se Di Co Asti 2004
Bobba Vergano  Antiche zecche della provincia di Asti.  Bobba ed. 1971
Bordone R.,  Dalla carità al credito. C.R.A. 2005
Fissore, Le miniature del codex astensis C.R.A. 2002
  De Canis G.S. Proposta per una lettura della corografia astigiana, C.R.A 1977
Gabiani Niccola,  Asti nei principali suoi ricordi storici vol 1, 2,3. Tip.Vinassa 1927-1934
Le torri le case-forti ed i palazzi nobili medievali in Asti,A.Forni ed.  1978
Grassi S., Storia della Città di Asti vol I, II. Atesa ed. 1987
S.G. Incisa,  Asti nelle sue chiese ed iscrizioni C. R.A. 1974
A.M. Patrone, Le Casane astigiane in Savoia, Dep. subalpina di storia patria, Torino 1959.
Peyrot  A.  Asti e l'Astigiano, tip.Torinese Ed. 1983
Ruggiero M. Briganti del Piemonte Napoleonico,Le Bouquiniste 1968
Scapino M. La cattedrale di Asti e il suo antico borgo,C.R.A.
Taricco S. Piccola storia dell'arte astigiana .Quaderno del Platano Ed. Il Platano 1994
Testa d.  Storia del Monferrato terza edizione ampliata Gribaudo-Lorenzo Fornaca editore Asti 1996
V.Malfatto Asti antiche e nobili casate. Il Portichetto  1982
Vergano L., Storia di Asti  Vol. 1,2,3 Tip.S.Giuseppe  Asti1953, 1957
Vicende storiche di Refrancore,L'autore  1996

See also

Asti

External links
Centro studi sui Lombardi
stemmi delle famiglie nobili di Asti 

Asti
Banking families